VolleyHut.com is an online retailer of volleyball products. In 2000, VolleyHut was among several companies that protested strongly against Amazon.com's patent relating to affiliate programs. Company owner Charlie Jackson challenged Amazon.com, saying "I have a small e-commerce site, VolleyHut.com, that sells volleyball equipment. I have an affiliate relationship with Volleycentral.com. I will continue to maintain the affiliate program, despite your patent. The reason is that I know you will not try to actually stop me, because your patent will not hold up in court if I decide to fight it, which I would. So, now you have been notified that someone is violating your patent. What are you going to do about it?"  Amazon.com took no action against VolleyHut.

Established in 1999, VolleyHut is based in Poway, California and owned by Charlie Jackson.

Jackson was an early Macintosh software publisher who founded Silicon Beach Software and co-founded FutureWave Software, which created the original version of what is now Adobe Flash.

VolleyHut established the Beach Volleyball Junior Olympics as a stand-alone event, hosting it in 1999 in San Diego.   Previously, the Beach Volleyball Junior Olympics had been held in conjunction with a pro beach volleyball event.

From 2000 to 2007, VolleyHut also assisted U.S. women players by sponsoring a team in the under-20 International Tournament held each year in Sibillini, Italy.

References

External links
 VolleyHut.com

Companies based in San Diego
Privately held companies based in California
Online retailers of the United States
Sporting goods retailers of the United States
Volleyball in the United States
Retail companies established in 1999
1999 establishments in California